Oxya bidentata is a species of grasshopper in the family Acrididae. It is a pest of millets.

References

bidentata
Insect pests of millets